Mordellistenalia maynei is a species of beetles in the family Mordellidae, the only species in the genus Mordellistenalia.

References

Mordellinae
Mordellidae genera
Monotypic Cucujiformia genera